Justice Murdu Nirupa Bidushinie Fernando, PC is a Sri Lankan judge and lawyer. She is a sitting puisne judge of the Supreme Court of Sri Lanka, prior to which she served as the Senior Additional Solicitor General in the Attorney General's Department.

Education
Educated at Princess of Wales' College, Moratuwa, where she was the head prefect and house captain, he won the awards for best debater and Junior Prize for the Most Outstanding Student. She went on to study law at the University of Colombo graduating with a LLB, and completed the law examinations at the Sri Lanka Law College, becoming the first in the order of merit and winning the First Scholarship, the Sir Lalitha Rajapakse Memorial Prize and the A. B. Cooray Memorial Prize. She would later gain an LL.M. from King’s College, London.

Legal career
Joining the Attorney General's Department as a State Counsel, she served for over 30 years having been promoted to Senior State Counsel, Deputy Solicitor General, Additional Solicitor General and Senior Additional Solicitor General. She was appointed a President's Counsel while serving as an Additional Solicitor General.

Supreme Court
Fernando was appointed as a Justice of the Supreme Court by President Maithripala Sirisena in March 2018.

References

Puisne Justices of the Supreme Court of Sri Lanka
President's Counsels (Sri Lanka)
Sinhalese judges
Sinhalese lawyers
Alumni of King's College London
Alumni of the University of Colombo
Year of birth missing (living people)
Living people